Liam Boyle may refer to:

 Liam Boyle (2000s hurler), hurler who plays with Ballyduff and Kerry
 Liam Boyle (Senior), hurler who played with Ballyduff
 Liam Boyle (actor) (born 1985), British actor